Pinelands is an affluent garden city suburb located on the edge of the southern suburbs of Cape Town, South Africa, neighbouring the suburb of Thornton, and is known for its large thatched houses and green spaces. The suburb is primarily residential and is often praised for its peacefulness and abundance of trees. Pinelands is one of the few areas in Cape Town in which sale of alcohol to the public is prohibited, but some clubs have private liquor licenses.   It is a popular place for senior citizens to retire to. While there are several retirement homes in the suburb, younger people are increasingly moving in.

The main road is called Forest Drive and the suburb contains two small shopping centres, namely Howard Centre (named after Ebenezer Howard who led the garden city movement) and Central Square. Dutch Reformed, Anglican, Presbyterian, Methodist and Catholic (Society of St. Pius X) churches are located near to Central Square, while Baptist, Church of England in South Africa and mainstream Catholic churches are located elsewhere in the suburb. Pinelands is served by two Metrorail railway stations: Pinelands station on the western edge of the suburb and Mutual station on the northern edge. The suburb is bisected from the north east to the south west by the Elsieskraal River, which has flowed through a large concrete drainage canal since the 1970s. Elsieskraal River also flows through the neighbouring suburb of Thornton, which is a similar residential suburb with an abundance of trees.

The postcodes for Pinelands are 7405 for street addresses and 7430 or 7450 for post office boxes. The telephone exchange codes for Pinelands are predominantly 531 and 532 (within the 021 dialling code for Cape Town).

History

The layout of Pinelands is based on the then revolutionary Garden Cities methodology of town planning by the British town-planner, Sir Ebenezer Howard. It was originally a Victorian era farm named Uitvlugt that had thousands of pine trees planted in it, and was later deemed an economic failure by the Department of Forestry. In the aftermath of the outbreak of the bubonic plague in Cape Town in February 1901, the colonial health authorities invoked Public Health Act of 1897 and quickly established a location in Uitvlugt forest station (modern day Pinelands). Black Africans living in District Six were rounded up under armed guard and taken to the location of Uitvlugt. This area was initially established primarily to quarantine Black Africans who were forcibly relocated after the outbreak of the disease, furthering efforts of the government at the time to push Black and Coloured communities to the outskirts of the city. This marked the beginning of forced removals in Cape Town in the twentieth century.

Almost 22 years later, the land was then granted to "The Garden Cities Trust" and the founding Deed of Trust was signed in 1919. One of the first members of the trust, Richard Stuttaford (head of the department store Stuttafords), made a £10,000 gift donation to serve as capital, and a loan of £15,000 from the government was invested in Pinelands. The trust brought in an overseas expert, Albert John Thompson, in 1920 to design the area.

The first (thatched) house in Pinelands to be occupied was 3 Mead Way and was built in February 1922. The house and entire street, including The Mead were declared a national monument in 1983. The original township area is currently a proposed heritage area. Pinelands converted to a municipality in 1948 and in 1996 merged into the City of Cape Town metropolitan municipality. The old Pinelands Town Council offices now accommodate the Pinelands Subcouncil.

Demographics
According to the 2011 census, the population of Pinelands was 14,198 people in 4,917 households. The following tables show various demographic data about Pinelands from that census.

Gender

Ethnic Group

Home Language

Age

Politics
Pinelands is part of ward 53 of the City of Cape Town. The ward also includes Thornton, Maitland Garden Village, Epping Industria 1, Ndabeni and part of Maitland; the current ward councillor is Riad Davids of the Democratic Alliance. Of the six voting districts in this ward, three of them cover Pinelands: the voting stations are at the Pinelands Primary School, Pinelands High School, and Pinehurst Primary School. Generally, the majority of voters in the  Pinelands area of the Ward vote for the Democratic Alliance.

The following tables show the sum of the votes cast in the three Pinelands voting districts at the most recent national, provincial and local elections.

Road names

Many of the road names in Pinelands have originated from local history or from places in England. One such road is named Uitvlugt (original Dutch) after the historical farm of the same name that covered what is now Pinelands. There are also roads named Letchworth and Welwyn after the first two garden cities in England. Other roads in Pinelands are named after places in the Lake District in England, the Royal Family as well as the names of birds, trees and flowers. Curiously, despite the attitude displayed to the sale of alcohol in Pinelands, there is a section where all the roads are named after well known wine farms.

Schools
In Pinelands there are three public primary schools, each of which is commonly known in the community by a colour: Pinelands Primary School ("The Blue School"), Pinelands North Primary School ("The Red School") and Pinehurst Primary School ("The Green School"). Pinelands High School is a public high school, centrally located in the suburb. Cannons Creek Independent School is a private combined primary and high school. Grace Primary School is a Christian primary school embracing a Charlotte Mason education philosophy. There are three  private pre-primaries in Pinelands: Meerendal Pre-Primary,  La Gratitude Pre-Primary, Learn and Play Centre Pre-School and Old Mutual for their employees. The high school campus of Vista Nova (a school for children with cerebral palsy and other special needs) is located in the suburb.

Sports

Pinelands has sporting facilities including tennis and lawn bowling clubs. Other sports include the cricket and hockey clubs situated at The Oval sports grounds situated on St. Stephens Road just off Forest Drive. Pinelands hockey club was founded in 1937 and is currently one of the largest clubs in the country fielding 12 men’s teams and 7 ladies teams in the Western Province Hockey Union league. Both the men’s and ladies’ first teams play in the Grand Challenge league with the men's team having won the title for the first time in 2006. In 2008 Pinelands Hockey Club produced three Olympians – Marvin Bam, Paul Blake and Austin Smith. Austin Smith was made the South African Men's Captain, having first played hockey for the Red School and the Pinelands High School.

Coat of arms

In January 1949, the municipal council assumed a coat of arms, designed by F. de Beaumont Beech.  It registered the arms with the Cape Provincial Administration in July 1954 and at the Bureau of Heraldry in July 1979.

The arms were : Or,  on a chevron Gules, between three fir-cones Sable, slipped and leaved Vert, three annulets Or (i.e. a golden shield depicting, from top to bottom, two black fir-cones with green leaves, a red chevron displaying three golden rings, and another black fir-cone with green leaves). The crest was a squirrel holding an acorn, and the motto was Fides – prudentia – labor.

See also
Huis der Nederlanden

References
 The History of Pinelands, Cape Town

External links
Pinelands Hockey
The Pinelands Catholic Church Website
Old and recent photos of Pinelands, Cape Town
Pinelands Community Directory
Councillor Brian Watkyns website

Suburbs of Cape Town
Garden suburbs